Ferraioloite is a rare mineral with formula MgMn2+4(Fe2+0.5Al0.5)4Zn4(PO4)8(OH)4(H2O)20. It is related to the phosphate mineral falsterite. Ferraioloite was found in pegmatites of the Foote Lithium Company Mine, Cleveland County, North Carolina, US. The name honors James (Jim) A. Ferraiolo (1947–2014).

References

Phosphate minerals
Manganese(II) minerals
Zinc minerals
Magnesium minerals
Iron(II) minerals
Aluminium minerals
Monoclinic minerals
Minerals in space group 12
Minerals described in 2016